Hanna Zora (15 March 1939, Batnaia, Tel Keppe, Iraq – 2 October 2016) was a Chaldean Catholic archbishop. He died in Tbilisi.

Ordained to the priesthood in 1962, Zora served as archbishop of Ahvaz of the Chaldeans, Iran, from 1974 to 2011. From then on, he served as archbishop of Mar Addai of Toronto of the Chaldeans from 2011–14.

References

1939 births
2016 deaths
Chaldean archbishops
People from Tel Keppe